Identity School of Acting is a part-time drama school that was founded in London, England by Femi Oguns in 2003. A second branch and campus opened in Los Angeles, California in 2018.

Identity School of Acting began in 2003 with 10 students at the Arcola Theatre in Hackney. Although open to prospective students of all ethnicities, Oguns founded the institution with the intent of reaching out to black and minority actors and promoting the diversity of the real world on stage and onscreen, as well as holding casting directors to account due to the lack of opportunity he had found in his own early acting experiences. The school later moved to Holborn, and then again to Brixton, as well as offering online classes. The school offers part-time acting training starting at age 16.

The school is affiliated with Identity Agency Group, which was established in 2006. However, the agency is a separate entity; not all students and alumni are necessarily represented by the agency, and not every actor represented by IAG is necessarily a student or alumnus of IDSA.

The Los Angeles branch of Identity School was launched in 2018 with alumni John Boyega, Letitia Wright, Malachi Kirby, Damson Idris, and Melanie Liburd as patrons of the new faculty. Oguns and Boyega launched a production arm of the institution, Identity Filmworks, in 2019.

Notable people
Femi Oguns, founder

Alumni

London

Adelayo Adedayo
Samuel Adewunmi
Shaquille Ali-Yebuah
John Boyega
Simona Brown
Noeleen Comiskey
Leonie Elliott
Fola Evans-Akingbola
Amelia Eve
Tanya Fear
Sophie Hopkins
Damson Idris
Osy Ikhile
Armin Karima
Malachi Kirby
Jessie Mei Li
Melanie Liburd
Judi Love
Tahj Miles
Zackary Momoh
Rukku Nahar
Weruche Opia
Chance Perdomo
Aaron Phagura
Jessica Plummer
Scribz Riley
Varada Sethu
Kenny Umeh
Tahirah Sharif
Lydia West
Letitia Wright

Los Angeles
Sonya Balmores

References

2003 establishments in England
2018 establishments in California
Drama schools in London
Drama schools in the United States
Educational institutions established in 2003
Educational institutions established in 2018